Arthur Shields (15 February 1896 – 27 April 1970) was an Irish actor on television, stage and film.

Early years
Born into an Irish Protestant family in Portobello, Dublin, Shields started acting in the Abbey Theatre when he was 17 years old. He was the younger brother of Oscar-winning actor Barry Fitzgerald. They were the sons of Adolphus Shields, who "was well-known in Dublin as a labour organiser" although the 1901 census listed his occupation as "press reader", and Fanny Sophia Shields (née Ungerland), who was German.

Irish nationalist activity
Along with six others of the Abbey Players, Shields fought in the Easter Rising of 1916. He was interned for six months in the Frongoch internment camp in Frongoch, Wales. His obituary in The Times of San Mateo, California, reported, "... upon his release he was decorated by the Republic of Eire."

Stage
Shields returned to the Abbey Theatre and had a varied career there from 1914 to 1939 as actor, assistant director, director and stage manager. He appeared in many productions ("more than 300 roles in 350 plays) while he was there, three of the productions he appeared in were by Irish playwright Teresa Deevy  'The Reapers'  'Temporal Powers' and 'Katie Roche'. Three times he brought the Abbey Company to the United States.

Film and television
In 1936, John Ford brought him to the United States to act in a film version of The Plough and the Stars, and in 1939 Shields decided to live permanently in California, where the mild climate would help his tuberculosis. Some of his memorable roles were in Ford films. Shields portrayed the Reverend Playfair in Ford's The Quiet Man, opposite John Wayne, Maureen O'Hara and his brother, Barry Fitzgerald. He played Dr. Laughlin in She Wore a Yellow Ribbon with Wayne and Joanne Dru, and appeared yet again with Wayne and Barry Fitzgerald in Ford's Long Voyage Home. His other films include: Little Nellie Kelly, The Keys of the Kingdom, The Fabulous Dorseys, Gallant Journey, The Shocking Miss Pilgrim, Drums Along the Mohawk, Apache Drums, Lady Godiva, National Velvet and The River. He also made television appearances including a 1958 role on Perry Mason as Dr. George Barnes in "The Case of the Screaming Woman" as well as a 1960 episode of Maverick starring Roger Moore titled "The Bold Fenian Men."

Personal life
Shields married Bazie Magee in 1920, and their son Adam was born in 1927. In 1943, the couple were divorced and Shields married Aideen O'Connor. Their daughter Christine was born in 1946. Aideen died in 1950. Shields' third marriage to Laurie Bailey in 1955 lasted until his death.

Shields died of complications related to emphysema on 27 April 1970, in Santa Barbara, California. He was survived by his wife, a daughter, a son and four grandchildren. His body was cremated, with the ashes taken to his native city of Dublin and buried with military honours in Deans Grange Cemetery.

Filmography

 Knocknagow (1918) – Phil Lahy 
 The Sign of the Cross (1932) – Chaplain Costello (1944 Re-Release Prologue) (uncredited)
 The Plough and the Stars (1936) – Irish Leader
 Drums Along the Mohawk (1939) – Reverend Rosenkrantz
 The Long Voyage Home (1940) – Donkeyman
 Little Nellie Kelly (1940) – Timothy Fogarty
 Lady Scarface (1941) – Matt Willis
 The Gay Falcon (1941) – Inspector Mike Waldeck
 How Green Was My Valley (1941) – Mr. Parry, deacon
 Confirm or Deny (1941) – Jeff, Blind Typist
 Broadway (1942) – Pete Dailey
 This Above All (1942) – Chaplain
 Pacific Rendezvous (1942) – Prof. Harvey Lessmore
 The Loves of Edgar Allan Poe (1942) – Griswald – Broadway Journal (uncredited)
 Dr. Renault's Secret (1942) – Inspector Duval (uncredited)
 Nightmare (1942) – Sergeant
 Gentleman Jim (1942) – Father Burke
 Dr. Gillespie's New Assistant (1942) – Mr. Kipp (uncredited)
 The Black Swan (1942) – The Bishop (uncredited)
 Random Harvest (1942) – Liverpool Chemist (uncredited)
 Above Suspicion (1943) – Walmer Hotel Porter (uncredited)
 The Man from Down Under (1943) – Father Polycarp
 Lassie Come Home (1943) – Andrew
 Madame Curie (1943) – Businessman (uncredited)
 The White Cliffs of Dover (1944) – Benson (uncredited)
 Youth Runs Wild (1944) – Mr. Dunlop
 National Velvet (1944) – Mr. Hallam
 The Keys of the Kingdom (1944) – Father Fitzgerald – Dean at Holywell
 Roughly Speaking (1945) – Minister (uncredited)
 The Picture of Dorian Gray (1945) – Street Preacher (uncredited)
 The Corn Is Green (1945) – Glyn Thomas
 The Valley of Decision (1945) – Callahan
 Too Young to Know (1945) – Mr. Enright
 Three Strangers (1946) – Prosecutor
 Gallant Journey (1946) – Father Kenton
 The Verdict (1946) – Rev. Holbrook
 Never Say Goodbye (1946) – McCarthy (uncredited)
 The Shocking Miss Pilgrim (1947) – Michael
 Easy Come, Easy Go (1947) – Timothy Mike Donovan
 The Fabulous Dorseys (1947) – Mr. Dorsey
 Seven Keys to Baldpate (1947) – Prof. Bolton
 Fighting Father Dunne (1948) – Mr. Michael O'Donnell
 My Own True Love (1948) – Iverson
 Tap Roots (1948) – Reverend Kirkland
 The Fighting O'Flynn (1949) – Dooley
 She Wore a Yellow Ribbon (1949) – Dr. O'Laughlin 
 Red Light (1949) – Father Redmond
 Challenge to Lassie (1949) – Dr. Lee
 Tarzan and the Slave Girl (1950) – Dr. E.E. Campbell
 A Wonderful Life (1951) – Pastor
 Blue Blood (1951) – Tim Donovan
 Apache Drums (1951) – Rev. Griffin
 Sealed Cargo (1951) – Kevin Dolan
 The River (1951) – Mr. John
 The People Against O'Hara (1951) – Mr. O'Hara
 The Barefoot Mailman (1951) – Ben Titus
 Jack and the Beanstalk (1952) – Patrick the Harp (voice)
 The Quiet Man (1952) – Reverend Mr. Cyril Playfair 
 Scandal at Scourie (1953) – Father Reilly
 South Sea Woman (1953) – 'Jimmy-legs' Donovan
 Main Street to Broadway (1953) – Actor in Fantasy Sequence
 World for Ransom (1954) – Sean O'Connor
 Pride of the Blue Grass (1954) – Wilson
 River of No Return (1954) – Minister at Tent City (uncredited)
 Lady Godiva of Coventry (1955) – Innkeeper
 The King and Four Queens (1956) – Padre
 The Daughter of Dr. Jekyll (1957) – Dr. Lomas
 Enchanted Island (1958) – James 'Jimmy' Dooley 
 Night of the Quarter Moon (1959) – Captain Tom O'Sullivan
 For the Love of Mike (1960) – Father Walsh
 The Pigeon That Took Rome (1962) – Monsignor O'Toole (final film role)

Television
Your Show Time – 26 episodes – The Bookshop Man (1949)
The Hardy Boys: The Mystery of the Applegate Treasure  – 8 episodes –  Boles (1956)
Perry Mason – episode – The Case of the Screaming Woman – Dr. George Barnes (1958)
Captain David Grief – episode – The Return of Blackbeard – Angus Macmor (1959) 
Bat Masterson – episode – The Conspiracy: Parts 1 & 2 – Dana Ruggles (1959)
Maverick – episode – The Bold Fenian Men – Terence Fogarty (1960)
Wagon Train – episode – The Amos Gibbon Story – Judge Tremayne (1960) 
Rawhide – episode – Incident of the Dust Flower – Sam Cartwright (1960)
Bonanza – episode – The Stranger – Dennis (1960) 
Death Valley Days – episode – Loophole – Jebal McSween (1961)

Playography 
 The Reapers (1930)
 Temporal Powers (1932)
 Katie Roche (1936)

References

External links

Arthur Shields at The Abbey Theatre Archive
Arthur Shields at The Teresa Deevy Archive

1896 births
1970 deaths
20th-century Irish male actors
Burials at Deans Grange Cemetery
Deaths from emphysema
Irish expatriate male actors in the United States
Irish male film actors
Irish male stage actors
Irish people of German descent
Irish Protestants
Members of the Irish Republican Brotherhood
Male actors from Dublin (city)
People of the Easter Rising
People from Portobello, Dublin